"New Age" is a song by British recording artist Marlon Roudette, released as the first single internationally from his debut studio album, Matter Fixed. The song was released as a single, initially in Germany, on 20 July 2011. After high airplay on VIVA Germany, the single charted at number one on its first week of release in German singles chart and remained at number one for 8 consecutive weeks. It also topped the charts in two other German-speaking European countries - Austria and Switzerland - and reached high positions in Belgium, Czech Republic, France, Hungary, the Netherlands, Poland and Slovakia. However, in Roudette's motherland, the UK, it was a market failure, reaching only number 90 in the UK Singles Chart.

It was the first single release from Roudette since his band Mattafix split, which is referenced by the album title. It has been certified Double Platinum in Germany for shipments exceeding 600,000 copies.

Track listing
 Digital download
"New Age" – 3:31

 Digital EP
"New Age" – 3:31
"New Age" (Sunship Remix) – 5:01
"New Age" (Astrixx Remix, featuring Smiler) – 3:17
"New Age" (Motto Blanco Remix) – 3:19
"New Age" (Soulseekers Remix) – 2:56

 German CD single
"New Age" – 3:31
"New Age" (New-Ark Remix) – 3:33

Charts and certifications

Weekly charts

Year-end charts

Certifications

See also
Mattafix

References

External links
Marlon Roudette on MySpace.
.

2011 debut singles
2011 songs
Marlon Roudette songs
Songs written by Guy Chambers
Songs written by Marlon Roudette
Song recordings produced by Guy Chambers
Number-one singles in Germany
Number-one singles in Austria
Number-one singles in Switzerland
Universal Music Group singles